The Bryse Peaks are the twin peaks of a small nunatak, located  north-northeast of Mason Peaks in the Grove Mountains. The nunatak was mapped from Australian National Antarctic Research Expeditions air photos, 1956–60, and named by the Antarctic Names Committee of Australia for R.A. Bryse, topographic draftsman, Division of National Mapping, Australian Department of National Development, who has contributed substantially to the production of Antarctic maps.

References 

Nunataks of Princess Elizabeth Land